Brett Herron (born 13 November 1995) is an English professional rugby union player who currently plays for Biarritz Olympique in Top 14.

Herron signed for Ulster from Bath in 2016. On 9 March 2018, Herron left Ulster to join Jersey Reds in the RFU Championship from the 2018–19 season.

On 22 March 2019, Herron returned to the Gallagher Premiership to sign for Harlequins from the 2019–20 season.

In 2021, he signs for Biarritz olympique in Top 14.

References

External links
Ulster Rugby Profile

1995 births
Living people
Irish rugby union players
Rugby union fly-halves
Ulster Rugby players
Jersey Reds players
Harlequin F.C. players
Rugby union players from Johannesburg